The Quest may refer to:

Film
 The Quest (1996 film), a martial-arts film
 The Quest (1958 film), a Canadian short drama film
 The Quest (1986 film), an Australian fantasy film
 The Quest (1915 film), an American silent film written by F. McGrew Willis

Publications
 The Quest (DeMille novel), a novel by Nelson DeMille
 The Quest (novel), a 2007 novel by Wilbur Smith
 The Quest: Energy, Security, and the Remaking of the Modern World, a 2011 book by Daniel Yergin

Television
 The Quest (1976 TV series), a 1976 Western television series starring Kurt Russell
 The Quest (1982 TV series), a 1982 TV series starring Perry King and Noah Beery Jr.
 The Quest (2014 TV series), a fantasy-based reality competition series on ABC
 The Quest (2022 TV series), a 2022 hybrid fantasy adventure/reality TV series on Disney+
 "The Quest" (Stargate SG-1), an episode of Stargate SG-1
 The Librarians (2014 TV series) or The Quest, an American fantasy television series

Music
 The Quest (ballet), a 1943 ballet by Frederick Ashton with music by William Walton
 The Quest (Mal Waldron album), a 1962 album by Mal Waldron
 The Quest (Yes album), a 2021 album by Yes
 Benno de Goeij, a Dutch record producer also known as The Quest.

Other uses
 The Quest (Corvallis, Oregon), a sculpture in Corvallis, Oregon
 The Quest (Portland, Oregon), a sculpture in Portland, Oregon
 The Quest (1983 video game), a graphical adventure game
 The Quest (2006 video game), a role-playing game
 The QUEST study, a veterinary research study

See also
 Quest (disambiguation)
 Qwest (disambiguation)